Tre Cancello Landing Strip is an abandoned World War II military airfield in Italy, which is located approximately 11 km east-northeast of Anzio; about 50 km south-southeast of Rome.  It was a temporary grass airfield used by the United States Army Air Force Twelfth Air Force 416th Night Fighter Squadron between 14  June and 8 July 1944, flying Bristol Beaufighters on night defensive interceptor patrols during the Anzio landing.

When the Americans pulled out the airfield was dismantled by engineers and returned to agriculture.   An outline of the runway remains in an agricultural field in aerial photos today.

References

 Maurer, Maurer. Air Force Combat Units of World War II. Maxwell AFB, Alabama: Office of Air Force History, 1983. .

External links

Airfields of the United States Army Air Forces in Italy
Airports established in 1943